Iceland competed at the 1976 Summer Olympics in Montreal, Quebec, Canada.

Results by event

Athletics

Men
Track & road events

Field events

Combined events – Decathlon

Women
Track & road events

Field events

Judo

 Viðar Guðjohnsen - Men's 80 kg
 Gísli Þorsteinsson - Men's 93 kg

Swimming

Men

Women

Weightlifting

Men

References
Official Olympic Reports

Nations at the 1976 Summer Olympics
1976 Summer Olympics
Summer Olympics